Robert Orledge (born 5 January 1948) is a British musicologist, and a professor emeritus of the University of Liverpool. He specialises in French music of the early twentieth century.

References

External links
Robert Orledge Website

1948 births
Living people
English musicologists
Academics of the University of Liverpool
Fauré scholars